The Faculty of Science is a constituent body of the University of New South Wales (UNSW), Australia. It is UNSW's second largest Faculty (after Engineering). It has over 400 academic staff and over 700 research staff and students.

The Faculty consists of nine Schools:
 School of Aviation
 School of Biological, Earth and Environmental Sciences
 School of Biotechnology and Biomolecular Sciences
 School of Chemistry
 School of Materials Science and Engineering
 School of Mathematics and Statistics
 School of Optometry and Vision Science
 School of Physics
 School of Psychology

Its other resources include primary partnership in the UNSW Analytical Centre (see below), field research stations at Cowan, Smiths Lake, Wellington and Fowlers Gap, and it is a partner in the Sydney Institute of Marine Science, located on Sydney Harbour at Chowder Bay. The Faculty is the primary administrative base for the Institute of Environmental Studies and a number of research centres, including: the Climate Change Research Centre; Evolution and Ecology Research Centre; Centre for Marine Bio-Innovation; Centre for Materials Research in Energy Conversion; the Clive and Vera Ramaciotti Centre for Gene Function Analysis; Injury Risk Management Research Centre (IRMRC); and the Centre for Groundwater Research (jointly with Faculty of Engineering). It is also associated with national Co-operative Research Centres (CRCs)in Environmental Biotechnology; Vision; Spatial Information Systems and Bushfire. It is also part of Australian Research Council Centres of Excellence for Mathematical and Statistical Modelling of Complex Systems; Quantum Computer Technology (CQCT); Design in Light Metals; and Functional Nanomaterials. As well, it is part of the National Cooperative Research Infrastructure Scheme and the National Health and Medical Research Council's program in Post-traumatic Mental Health.

History
A Faculty of Science was established as one of the first three faculties of the New South Wales University of Technology (later the University of New South Wales) at the university's Council meeting on 8 May 1950.  Teaching in the subjects of applied chemistry and chemical engineering had, however, commenced the previous year.
 
The present Faculty structure represents the outcome of two major and several minor UNSW restructures since 1997, with the primary aim of operational simplification and administrative efficiency. Before 1997 science teaching and research at UNSW was spread across three Faculties: Science; Biological & Behavioural Science; and Applied Science. In 1997 the three Science faculties were disestablished and two new faculties were created - a Faculty of Science and Technology  and a Faculty of Life Sciences. In 2001, a second major restructure amalgamated most of the science schools resident in these two Faculties into a single new Faculty of Science. A 2009 review of research in the Faculty resulted in the closure of the School of Risk & Safety Sciences in 2010.

Within the School of Physics, the Centre for Quantum Computer Technology has three major research laboratories at the University of New South Wales: the Atomic Fabrication Facility (AFF), the National Magnet Laboratory (NML) and the Semiconductor Nanofabrication Facility (SNF). These all allow for nanoscale device fabrication and measurement.

Mark Wainwright Analytical Centre
Adjacent to the Chemical Sciences building, (Applied Science), is the new Mark Wainwright Analytical Centre (MWAC) designed by Francis-Jones Morehen Thorp, the goal of which is to co-locate major research instrumentation in a single, purpose-built, high-grade facility for the university.

The Analytical Centre houses the most important major instruments used in the Faculties of Science, Medicine and Engineering for the study of the structure and composition of biological, chemical and physical materials and also includes preparation laboratories, smaller instruments and computing facilities. In addition, it provides the technical/professional support for the instruments. The building also houses new teaching and research laboratories for the School of Chemistry.

The Mark Wainwright Analytical Centre consolidates the management of resources to minimise unnecessary duplication, as well as providing the appropriate infrastructure to support the instruments and a world-class research environment within which the instrumentation can operate to specification.

Additionally, the new Analytical Centre has recently received a $500,000 grant from the Magnowski Institute of Applied Science to use in further advances in the studies of applied science.

References

External links
 UNSW Faculty of Science website
 / UNSW Science Facebook page

Science, Faculty of